The Lovers of Manon Lescaut (Italian: Gli amori di Manon Lescaut) is a 1954 French-Italian historical melodrama film directed by Mario Costa and starring Myriam Bru, Franco Interlenghi and Roger Pigaut. It is based on the 1731 novel Manon Lescaut by Antoine François Prévost, which has been made into films on a number of occasions.

The film's sets were designed by Giancarlo Bartolini Salimbeni.

Cast
 Myriam Bru as Manon Lescaut  
 Franco Interlenghi as Enrico des Grieux  
 Roger Pigaut as Lescaut  
 Aldo Silvani as Conte des Grieux  
 Marisa Merlini as Elisa  
 Nerio Bernardi as Barone de Forté  
 Luigi Pavese as Il mercante premuroso  
 Paolo Poli as Tiberge  
 Lily Granado  as Adriana  
 Lia Reiner  as Affitacamere 
 Franco Scandurra as Chatodoux  
 Georges Bréhat as Il barone giocatore  
 Olga Solbelli as La suora nel carcere  
 Nico Pepe as Il gioielliere  
 Ugo Sasso as Un gendarme  
 Peter Trent as Conte di Loisy  
 Franco Pesce as Giovanni  
 Ileana Lauro 
 Lia Lena 
 Nada Cortese  
 Hedda Linton  
 Pino Sciacqua
 Luigi Tosi 
 Louis Seigner as Duca di Forchamps  
 Jacques Castelot as Marchese de Boysson

References

Bibliography 
 Goble, Alan. The Complete Index to Literary Sources in Film. Walter de Gruyter, 1999.

External links 
 

French historical drama films
Italian historical drama films
1950s historical drama films
1954 films
1950s Italian-language films
Films directed by Mario Costa
Films set in the 18th century
Films based on French novels
Films based on works by Antoine François Prévost
1954 drama films
Films scored by Renzo Rossellini
Melodrama films
1950s Italian films
1950s French films